In Pittsburgh sports lore history, many extraordinary events have contributed to the city's sports franchises winning — and almost winning — titles. Other events in the city's sports history have been iconic for other reasons.

Pirates wins

Mazeroski's Home Run

Mazeroski's Home Run was the home run hit by Pirates second baseman, Bill Mazeroski, in Game 7 of the 1960 World Series against the New York Yankees, played on October 13, 1960. It gave the Pirates a 10–9 victory, their first World Series title in 35 years, was the first home run to end a World Series, and remains the only one to decide it in the climactic seventh game. Mazeroski has remarked that he was so focused on the play on the field that he had to be reminded he was the lead-off batter in the bottom of the ninth. Coincidentally, Mazeroski, who wore #9 for the Pirates, came to bat in the bottom of the 9th inning with the score tied 9-9.

The play
In the seventh game of the 1960 World Series, the Pirates and Yankees were locked in a "teeter-totter battle" that had settled into a 9–9 tie going into the bottom of the ninth inning. Yankees pitcher Ralph Terry faced the Pirates' lead-off batter for the inning, Bill Mazeroski. With the count one ball, zero strikes, Mazeroski hit a line drive toward deep left field that cleared the wall for a solo home run.

Announcer reactions

Notes
 Pirates' catcher Hal Smith had helped to set the stage for Mazeroski's dramatic home run one inning earlier when he capped off a Pirates rally with a pivotal three-run home run of his own. Smith's home run put the Pirates ahead 9–7, but its true value was realized when the Yankees scored two runs in the top of the ninth inning to tie the score. Thus, instead of Mazeroski coming to bat in the bottom of the ninth with the score 9–6 in favor of the Yankees, the game was tied with the winning run (in the form of Mazeroski) at the plate. Based on a review of Championship Win probability added (cWPA), it can be argued that Smith's home run was the most important hit in MLB history to secure a championship — more important than even Mazeroski's walk-off!
 Since Mazeroski's home run in 1960, only Joe Carter has repeated the feat of ending the World Series with a home run, hitting one for the Toronto Blue Jays in the 1993 World Series. However, Mazeroski's remains the only walk-off Series-winning home run to come in the deciding Game 7.
 The home run capped an improbable World Series victory for Pittsburgh, whose three losses to New York were by scores of 16–3, 10–0 and 12–0. In total, the Pirates were outscored 55–27 in the series, and their biggest margin of victory was three runs: a 5–2 victory in Game 5.
 The city of Pittsburgh had suffered its longest pro-sports championship drought by 1960, having waited 35 years since the Pirates won the 1925 World Series; meanwhile at the time, the Steelers were mediocre at best, the city had long ago lost its NHL Pirates, and had seen only spotty success during the intervening period from their minor-league hockey team, the Hornets. Many local sports fans felt bittersweet going into the Series, since the Pirates had been swept by the mighty "Murder's Row" Yankees during their last Series appearance in 1927; and by Game 7 in 1960, it was clear—through even a cursory examination of a stat sheet—that the Yankees were clearly outplaying the Pirates, reminiscent of 1927. Furthermore, the surprising but nail-biting wins that the Pirates had managed to collect in order to force a Game 7 had done little to buoy the hopes of the region's fans.
 Hall of Famer Mickey Mantle admitted that out of all the losses he experienced both as an amateur and a professional, the Game 7 loss to the Pirates in 1960 is the only one that was so emotionally disheartening that it brought him to tears.
 Hall of Famer (and former Pittsburgh Pirates player) Casey Stengel was fired, ostensibly as a fall guy for the Series defeat, shortly afterward. The reason given for his dismissal was that he was too old to properly focus on the game, to which he famously quipped, "I'll never make the mistake of being 70 again!"
 Mazeroski and Roberto Clemente were the last two players from the 1960 Pirates World Series team that were part of the Pirates' next World Series team in 1971. And Danny Murtaugh was the Pirates' manager for both of those victorious World Series teams.
 Mazeroski had also hit a home run in the fourth inning of Game 1 of the Series. The run he scored on his home run proved to be the deciding run of the game, meaning that Mazeroski holds the distinction of both scoring and driving in the winning runs in the opening and concluding games of the same World Series.
 This World Series victory marked only the second time the Pirates claimed a title at home.  As with the first occurrence (1925), Game 7 was played in Forbes Field.

The Comeback I

Facing elimination against the defending World Series champions (the Washington Senators), the Pirates become the first MLB team to recover from a 3-games-to-1 deficit in a best-of-seven World Series contest to claim their second overall World Series title.

Notes
 This World Series victory marks the first time the Pirates claimed the title at home, winning Game 7 in Forbes Field.
 Game 7 was played in miserable weather conditions, described as "probably the worst conditions ever for a World Series game."

The Comeback II

Once again facing elimination in the "Fall Classic" and led by the 1978 NL Comeback Player of the Year recipient, Willie Stargell, the Pirates rallied from a 3-games-to-1 deficit to claim their fifth overall World Series title and second within the decade of the 1970s.

Notes
 Both of the Pirates' World Series victories in the 1970s came against the Baltimore Orioles. In a curious string of coincidences surrounding those Series victories:
 Both deciding Game 7 matches were played in Baltimore's Memorial Stadium on October 17, exactly eight years apart.
 Stargell (who wore #8) scored the winning run in both Game 7 matches, making him the first (and to date, only) player in MLB history to score the winning tallies in two World Series Game 7 matches. Stargell's winning run in Game 7 of the 1971 World Series came in the eighth inning.
 This World Series victory marked the second time a Pirates team had won a title when facing elimination going into Game 5. To date, only the Pirates have accomplished this feat more than once.
 The team became known as the "We Are Family Pirates" after adopting the Sister Sledge hit as their theme song.
 The 1979 Pirates were also the last team to win Game 7 on the road until the 2014 San Francisco Giants.

You can steal first
With the Pirates on their way to another losing season, manager Lloyd McClendon rallied the team during a June 26, 2001 rivalry game against Milwaukee. He was ejected after arguing a call with the home plate umpire in the 7th inning, and defiantly picked up first base and walked off the field with it, sparking the Pirates go on to win 7–6.

The Relay, or "The Curse Reverser"
On September 23, 2013, the Pirates' magic number to secure a playoff spot, their first since 1992, was 2. The Pirates needed a win that night against the Chicago Cubs at Wrigley Field, plus a loss by the Washington Nationals, in order to clinch a playoff berth.

In the bottom of the ninth inning, the Pirates were leading 2–1 with two outs and a Chicago runner, Nate Schierholtz, on first. Closer Jason Grilli was on the mound for Pittsburgh. Ryan Sweeney, one of the Cubs' outfielders, singled into right field. Pirates' right fielder Marlon Byrd bobbled the ball as Schierholtz, the tying run, neared third. Center fielder Andrew McCutchen, who had been backing Byrd up on the play, quickly scooped up the ball and launched it towards home plate. As Schierholtz broke for home, McCutchen's throw, which was clearly off-line, was cut off by first baseman Justin Morneau, who was positioned near the pitcher's mound as the play unfolded. Morneau caught McCutchen's throw, then quickly relayed to catcher Russell Martin. Just as the catch was made, Schierholtz collided with Martin and both tumbled to the ground. Martin rose dramatically with ball in hand, the umpire signaled "out", and the Pirates won. Martin, still kneeling and holding the ball aloft, was embraced by a jubilant Grilli.

Later that night, a loss by the Washington Nationals ensured the Pirates' first playoff berth since 1992, when they lost the deciding game of the NL Championship Series to the Atlanta Braves on an eerily similar play.

Announcer reactions

Notes
 The Pirates had led the Cubs 1-0 throughout the majority of the game, until their usually reliable set-up man Mark Melancon failed to hold in the 8th, allowing the game to be tied at one. In the top of the ninth with two outs, Starling Marte, who had been a defensive replacement in the seventh and was just coming off a stint on the disabled list, launched a solo home run in his first at-bat to allow the Pirates to retake the lead.

The Drop Seen 'Round the World: The Cueto Chant
During the bottom of the second inning in the 2013 NL Wild Card Game against the Cincinnati Reds, Pirates' catcher Russell Martin stepped up to the plate to face Reds' ace pitcher Johnny Cueto. The crowd at the park was incredibly intense, having not seen playoff baseball in 20 years, many fans experiencing their first ever playoff game in their lifetimes. A rhythmic chant of "CUE-TO, CUE-TO" began to rise through the cheers, mocking Cueto, who had given up a solo home run to Marlon Byrd earlier in the inning. The chant grew in volume until the pitcher's name echoed loudly through the entire park. Cueto, visibly rattled, set himself on the mound and began wiping the ball with his hands. Seconds later, he fumbled it and it fell to the ground, rolling a few feet away. The crowd roared with a mixture of laughter and applause, and their chants grew even louder as he quickly recovered the baseball and returned to the mound. Cueto attempted to gather himself, but the next pitch he threw, a fastball over the heart of the plate, would be launched into the left-field bleachers by Martin, giving the Pirates a 2–0 lead and the momentum they would need to secure the win.

The TBS television broadcasting crew of Ernie Johnson Jr., Ron Darling, and Cal Ripken Jr. were impressed by the Pittsburgh fans, saying they had never heard baseball fans chant at that magnitude since Boston Red Sox fans infamously taunted Darryl Strawberry during Game 5 of the 1986 World Series; Darling called it the sound of "21 years of frustration, dressed in black" (Pirates fans had been encouraged by Andrew McCutchen to dress in black for the game).

The Back-To-Back Comebacks
Just prior to the 2015 All-Star Game, the Pirates played a four-game weekend series at home against their division rivals, the St. Louis Cardinals, whom they trailed by 4.5 games for the lead in the NL Central. After splitting the first two games, the teams prepared to play two nationally televised games on Saturday, July 11 and Sunday, July 12. In the second inning of Saturday's game, A. J. Burnett appeared to strikeout Cardinals' first baseman Mark Reynolds, who swung at a 1–2 pitch in the dirt; however, home plate umpire Vic Carapazza said Reynolds foul tipped the ball (though several replays clearly showed that he didn't), keeping his at-bat alive. On the very next pitch, Reynolds hit a solo home run to left field, giving the Cardinals a 1–0 lead. Pirates' catcher Francisco Cervelli and manager Clint Hurdle were subsequently ejected for arguing the call. The Cardinals opened up a 3–0 lead before Burnett homered in the 6th to cut the lead to 3–1. The Pirates tied the game in the eighth after consecutive RBI base hits by Jung-ho Kang and Pedro Alvarez; the score remained tied heading into extra innings. In the tenth, the Cardinals took 4–3 lead on Reynolds' second solo home run of the game, only to see the Pirates score in the bottom of the inning and tie the game again. After the Cardinals took a 5–4 lead in the 14th, Neil Walker led off the bottom of the inning with a base hit and the next batter, Andrew McCutchen, hit a home run to straight away center off reliever Nick Greenwood, giving the Pirates a 6–5 walk-off victory.

The next night, the game was once again tied at 3 heading into extra innings. In the top of the tenth, Cardinals outfielder Randal Grichuk doubled home Pete Kozma and Yadier Molina to give the Cards a 5–3 lead. Jordy Mercer led off the bottom of the 10th with a base hit, before Neil Walker and Andrew McCutchen were retired by Cardinals closer Trevor Rosenthal. With two outs, Starling Marte hit a line drive to right field, scoring Mercer. Jung-ho Kang followed with a base hit, as did Francisco Cervelli, allowing Marte to score from 2nd and tie the game at 5. After Travis Ishikawa walked on 4 pitches, Gregory Polanco lined the first pitch he saw into right field, scoring Kang from 3rd, giving the Pirates their second 6–5 extra innings win in as many nights. By taking 3 of 4 games in the series, the Pirates were able to cut the Cardinals' division lead to 2.5 games heading into the All-Star break. Given the high stakes of the series, combined with an incredibly emotional, postseason-like atmosphere and a national audience, many fans consider this to be the best weekend series in the history of PNC Park.

Announcer reactions

Pirates losses

Homer in the Gloamin'

For most of the 1938 season, the Pirates had led the National League and seemed on their way to a pennant. But in the final month of the season, they started to falter, losing a 6.5 game lead in the beginning of September and by the time they played the Chicago Cubs in a three-game series at Wrigley Field late in the month, they were only up by 2. The Cubs won the first game, narrowing the lead to 0.5. The next game on September 28, 1938, was tied at 5–5 in the bottom of the ninth inning. With an 0–2 count, Gabby Hartnett hit a Mace Brown pitch for a home run to win the game for the Cubs. The Pirates lost four of the next five games to close out the season while the Cubs went on to clinch the pennant.

The Heartbreaker I
The Cincinnati Reds had overcome a 2-games-to-1 deficit in the 1972 National League Championship Series to force a deciding Game 5 in Cincinnati. The Pirates claimed an early 2–0 lead in the game, then traded runs in the middle innings with the Reds to take a 3–2 advantage into the bottom of the ninth inning. Three outs from returning to the World Series as the defending champs, normally dependable Pirates closer Dave Giusti surrendered a home run to Johnny Bench, tying the game. After allowing two base hits to Tony Pérez and Denis Menke, Giusti was replaced on the mound by Bob Moose. After coaxing the next two Reds batters to fly out, Moose unleashed a wild pitch with runners on second and third, allowing the winning run to score.

For Pirates fans, it seemed that the heartbreaks surrounding this game would continue for almost four years:  only two short months later, star right fielder Roberto Clemente was tragically killed in an airplane crash off of the Puerto Rican coast; and four years later, pitcher Bob Moose was tragically killed in an automobile crash en route to a celebrity golf tournament.

Announcer reactions

The Heartbreaker II/The 20-Year Curse
Twenty years later, history seemingly repeated itself for the Pirates. In the 1992 National League Championship Series (NLCS), the Pirates (who had "three-peated" as division champs) faced the Atlanta Braves in a rematch of the previous year's NLCS. The Game 7 series decider, held on Wednesday October 14, was its most memorable contest. The Pirates' Doug Drabek pitched masterfully for the first eight innings, holding the Braves scoreless. His only real scare came in the sixth, when the Braves loaded the bases with none out. But Jeff Blauser lined into a double-play and Terry Pendleton flew out to end the inning. Meanwhile, Pittsburgh wasn't doing much with Atlanta starter John Smoltz, but they did manage single tallies in the first on an Orlando Merced sacrifice fly and in the sixth on an RBI single by Andy Van Slyke.

The play
The Pirates took their 2–0 lead into the bottom of the ninth, when their season imploded. Drabek allowed an inning-opening double to Pendleton. In what would prove to be a crucial play, normally sure-handed second baseman José Lind then booted David Justice's easy grounder. A walk to Sid Bream loaded the bases, and Stan Belinda replaced Drabek. Ron Gant then plated one run with a sacrifice fly to make it 2–1, and Damon Berryhill walked to reload the bases. Pinch-hitter Brian Hunter popped up to second base with nobody scoring, and it looked like Pittsburgh might escape. But pinch-hitter Francisco Cabrera singled to left to score Justice and — just ahead of Barry Bonds' throw — Bream. The Braves piled onto Bream at the plate, the stadium erupted, and Atlanta went back to the World Series. Meanwhile, it took the Pirates twenty-one seasons to return to post-season play — and compile a winning record for a season.

Announcer reactions

Notes
 Sid Bream played for Pittsburgh from 1985 to 1990 and has long made his home north of the city.
 The Pirates had found themselves in a familiar situation during the 1992 NLCS:  down 3-games-to-1 and facing elimination going into Game 5. In fact, they had come within one out of re-accomplishing the feats of the 1925 and 1979 Pirates in overcoming such a deficit in post-season play (albeit this time in the NLCS rather than the World Series).

The Sausage incident
At Milwaukee on July 9, 2003, Randall Simon, who played first base for Pittsburgh at the time, was arrested, suspended and fined for swinging a baseball bat from the dugout at the head of a Milwaukee stadium Sausage runner's costume. The tap didn't hit the actual head of Mandy Block, who was wearing the Italian sausage costume, but did knock her over causing a chain reaction that took the "hot dog" costumed runner down with her. The Polish sausage helped the Italian sausage up and all sausages finished the race. The Pirates lost the game 2–1.

Simon later apologized and Block asked only that the offending bat be autographed and given to her. Simon obliged. Later that year, Mandy Block received a complimentary trip to Curaçao, Simon's home island, from the Curaçao Tourism Board. Since the incident, T-shirts and other memorabilia have been sold with the slogan "Don't whack our wiener!" Later that season, Simon was traded to the Chicago Cubs, and when they visited Milwaukee later that season, during the sausage race, his teammates playfully held him back, while manager Dusty Baker guarded the bat rack. At that same game, Simon had also bought a pack of Italian sausages to a random section of fans at the ballpark.

Worst Call Ever
At 2:00 am on July 26, 2011, in the bottom of the 19th inning (the fourth-longest game in franchise history), the Pirates were ironically handed another disheartening loss against the Atlanta Braves, this time in the form of a blown call by home plate umpire Jerry Meals.

Posting their best regular-season record in 19 years and on pace for a wild-card playoff spot, a night game tied at 3–3 in Atlanta dragged on into extra innings. In the bottom of the 19th inning, Atlanta placed runners on first and third with one out. Atlanta's Scott Proctor hit a ground ball to third base which was fielded cleanly by Pedro Alvarez. Alvarez threw home to Pirates' catcher Michael McKenry, who appeared to apply the tag to the Atlanta base runner, Julio Lugo, in plenty of time. To the shock of everyone watching, home plate umpire Jerry Meals indicated that Lugo had somehow avoided the tag by signalling "safe." Pirates manager Clint Hurdle came out to argue the call, but the argument fell on deaf ears, and the Braves won the game 4–3. Meals came under severe criticism from the media and Pirates fans.

While this was only one loss in what was otherwise a winning season to that point, the play seemingly resurrected too many "ghosts of '92", and put the Pirates into a season-breaking tailspin from which they could not recover. After this game, the Pirates lost 10 games in a row, and in no time, fell out of the playoff race while securing their 19th straight losing season.

Steelers wins

Immaculate Reception

In the 1972 AFC Divisional Playoff Game against the Oakland Raiders, The Steelers found themselves trailing in the score, "4th and long", 60 yards from the end zone, and down to their last play. A desperation pass, actually intended for the Steelers' other running back, John "Frenchy" Fuqua, ricocheted to rookie running back Franco Harris, who made an incredible, "shoe-string" catch and ran the ball in for the winning touchdown. The play, soon dubbed the Immaculate Reception, became one of the most famous and controversial plays in the history of sports.

The Immaculate Deflection

January 14, 1996: Trailing by four points (20–16) and with five seconds remaining in the AFC Championship Game, the Indianapolis Colts needed to score a touchdown to defeat the Steelers, with the winner advancing to Super Bowl XXX. With the ball at the Steelers' 29-yard line, Colts QB Jim Harbaugh lofted a pass into the corner of the end zone. The pass seemingly hung in the air forever, and was batted down by Steelers defensive back Myron Bell. However, the ball was knocked straight down onto the stomach of fallen Colts WR Aaron Bailey. On the television camera feed, the view of the ball was lost for a split second, after which Bailey had possession of the ball. The Colts immediately began signalling touchdown, and the Steelers defensive backs vehemently signaled incomplete. The back judge, however, ruled that the ball hit the ground, and after a lengthy discussion, the referee declared the pass to be incomplete – which other camera angles would show was correct.

The Comeback I
 (January 5, 2003, Cleveland Browns vs. Pittsburgh Steelers, AFC Wild Card Playoff Game)

Trailing by 17 points, a 24–7 disadvantage with 19 minutes left to play, the NFL Comeback Player of the Year Quarterback Tommy Maddox rallied the Steelers, scoring three passing touchdowns in four offensive drives. The Browns managed to score 9 points in the 4th quarter keeping them in the lead (33–28) until a 61-yard drive, culminating in a 3-yard rushing touchdown and a successful two-point conversion by the Steelers. At 36–33, with 54 seconds left in regulation, it was the first time in the game that the Steelers had been leading on the scoreboard. The Browns failed to answer back in their final drive, ending the game in one of the greatest comebacks in NFL playoff history.

The Tackle/Immaculate Redemption

The Tackle or The Immaculate Redemption refers to an event that occurred on January 15, 2006, during the AFC Divisional Round between the Steelers and the heavily favored Indianapolis Colts. Clinging to a 3-point lead, Steelers quarterback Ben Roethlisberger made a game-saving tackle against Colts cornerback Nick Harper, who nearly returned a fumble by running back Jerome Bettis for the go-ahead touchdown.

The play
With 1:20 remaining in the game, Pittsburgh's Joey Porter sacked Colts quarterback Peyton Manning on fourth down at Indianapolis's 2-yard line. The Steelers, leading 21–18, appeared to have clinched victory as the Colts turned the ball over to them on downs. Since the Colts had all three of their timeouts, the Steelers were forced to try for a two-yard touchdown; they would be unable to run the clock out by simply kneeling on the ball.

On first and goal, Pittsburgh veteran running back Jerome Bettis (who hadn't fumbled throughout the 2005 NFL season) spun to his left near the goal line with the ball cradled in his left arm. Colts linebacker Gary Brackett put his helmet squarely on the ball, and it popped out of Bettis's arm, back behind the line of scrimmage. Immediately, Colts cornerback Nick Harper picked up the ball and headed for the Steelers' end zone with several blockers around him. It very much appeared as if Harper would take the football all of the way for a go-ahead, possible game-winning touchdown, with precious little time left. As Harper was running down the field, Roethlisberger, who had been turned completely around several times desperately trying to stay in front of the speedy Harper, managed to get a hold of Harper's right shin by diving in a backwards twisting motion, and make a shoestring tackle to bring him down at the Colts' 42-yard line.

The tackle would later prove to be the play of the season, as afterward, the Colts, while denied a touchdown return, tried to drive down the field in an attempt to score a touchdown. On 2nd & 3rd and 2, the Colts took deep shots down the left sideline to Reggie Wayne. Both passes were blocked by rookie Bryant McFadden. This playcalling was questioned as a simple running play could have extended the drive. But the Colts were eventually forced into a potential game-tying 46-yard field goal attempt. However, kicker Mike Vanderjagt (the most accurate kicker in NFL history) missed it terribly wide-right and the Steelers held on to win 21–18. Vanderjagt's miss was his last attempt in a Colts uniform. He would sign with Dallas after the season ended.

Vanderjagt was flagged for unsportsmanlike conduct after the kick because he removed his helmet and slammed it to the RCA Dome turf.

Fueled by this play, the Steelers traveled to Denver and dominated the Denver Broncos in a 34–17 upset a week later in the AFC Championship Game, then defeated the Seattle Seahawks 21–10 on February 5, 2006, in Super Bowl XL to claim their first NFL title in twenty-six years.

Views
 If Harper had scored and ended Pittsburgh's season, it would have created a bitter ending to the career of Jerome Bettis, who would have been blamed with costing Pittsburgh the win with his fumble. Instead, Pittsburgh won and Bettis got to later return to his hometown, Detroit, and win his lone championship ring before retiring. Bettis did, however, state that if Pittsburgh lost the Super Bowl or did not reach it that he may have returned for one last season.
 After Roethlisberger's tackle, the game was saved a second time by cornerback Bryant McFadden. On 2nd and 2 from the Pittsburgh 29, Colts QB Peyton Manning fired to the corner of the endzone, looking for star receiver Reggie Wayne. McFadden matched Wayne stride for stride into the endzone and just as Wayne appeared to make the catch, McFadden got an arm between Wayne's arms and knocked the ball free. As it hovered in the air, both Wayne and McFadden dove for the ball, as McFadden foiled two subsequent attempts by Wayne to catch the tipped ball as they went to the ground.

Note
 Harper's wife, Daniell, had been arrested the night before the game after slicing his knee during an argument. The injury required three stitches but did not prevent him from playing the next day.

The Interception/Immaculate Interception
With 18 seconds left in the first half of Super Bowl XLIII, the Arizona Cardinals were on the Steelers' 2-yard line and threatened to take a 14–10 lead into halftime. The Cardinals sent receiver Anquan Boldin on a quick slant route and Larry Fitzgerald on a quick post route, hoping to shake a defender and allow a quick scoring pass. Arizona quarterback Kurt Warner's pre-snap read was an all-out blitz by its linebackers and defensive line. In order to avoid the impending pass rush, Warner threw the ball to Boldin. However, outside linebacker James Harrison had in fact faked the blitz and dropped back into coverage, right in the passing lane to Boldin. Harrison intercepted the ball on the goal line and started to return the pick. After almost running into fellow Steeler Deshea Townsend, Harrison darted down the sidelines, following his blockers and hurdling Cardinals players down to the goal line. Fitzgerald, after bumping into teammate Antrel Rolle who had wandered from the sidelines onto the field of play, still caught up to Harrison on the Cardinals' 5-yard line. He and fellow Cardinal Steve Breaston grabbed Harrison but were unable to bring him down before he scored on the longest play in Super Bowl history—a 100-yard interception return as the clock ticked down to zero. Harrison, exhausted, lay on the ground for a while before getting up. The play ultimately was a 14-point swing, allowing the Steelers to go to the locker room up 17–7.

The Catch (The Tampa Toe-chdown)

In the fourth quarter of Super Bowl XLIII, the Arizona Cardinals stormed back from a 20–7 deficit to take a 23–20 lead on two touchdowns by All-Pro wideout Larry Fitzgerald as well as a safety caused by a holding penalty against the Steelers in their own endzone. Trailing for the first time in the game, Pittsburgh then marched down the field in impressive fashion to set up a potential go-ahead touchdown with less than one minute remaining. On second-and-goal from the Arizona 6-yard line, quarterback Ben Roethlisberger threw high to the right corner of the endzone where receiver Santonio Holmes made an incredible diving catch on his toes and miraculously kept both feet in bounds while maintaining control of the ball. The Steelers went ahead 27-23 and proceeded to win their record sixth Super Bowl title.

The Meltdown at Paul Brown
In a rain-soaked vicious battle between two AFC North rivals at Paul Brown Stadium on January 9, 2016, filled with injuries and personal fouls on both sides, the Steelers held a 15–0 lead entering the fourth quarter before the Cincinnati Bengals scored three times to take a 16–15 lead. After briefly leaving the game due to injury and with the ball on his own 11-yard line with 1:23 left, Ben Roethlisberger returned to lead his team 74 yards in nine plays for the game-winning score. After several short completions moved the ball to the 37-yard line, Pittsburgh faced a 4th-and-3, but overcame it on Antonio Brown's 12-yard reception. On the next play, with just 22 seconds left, Roethlisberger threw a pass intended for Brown. The pass was incomplete, but Bengals linebacker Vontaze Burfict was flagged for a personal foul for contact with Brown's helmet. Brown was injured on the play, and as he was being attended and officials were dealing with both teams, Adam "Pacman" Jones was flagged for a personal foul after an altercation with Steelers linebackers coach Joey Porter, giving the Steelers another 15 yards and moving the ball to the Bengals' 17-yard line. On the next play, Chris Boswell kicked a 35-yard field goal with 18 seconds left to win the game.

Burfict received a three-game suspension for his hit on Brown (including the Week 2 matchup between the two teams the following season), while four players and two assistant coaches also received fines. Jones received the most severe fine at $28,000, while Steelers lineman Ramon Foster was fined $17,000. Bengals defensive linemen Wallace Gilberry and Domata Peko each received an $8,600 fine, while Porter and fellow Steelers assistant coach Mike Munchak were fined $10,000 each. In the offseason, the league passed a rule banning any coaches except for the head coach from entering the field of play, and then only to check on an injured player, directly in response to the incident.

Immaculate Extension
On December 25, 2016, the 9–5 Pittsburgh Steelers hosted the 8–6 Baltimore Ravens in a crucial Week 16 matchup of the 2016 NFL season. With a win, the Steelers would clinch the AFC North and eliminate the Ravens from playoff contention. Trailing 10–20 early in the fourth quarter, the Steelers quickly came back to take a 24–20 lead midway through the fourth quarter. However the Ravens went on a long 75-yard that lasted almost 6 minutes. The drive ended with a 10-yard touchdown run by running back Kyle Juszczyk, giving the Ravens a 27–24 lead with only 1:18 remaining. Starting from their own 25-yard line with two timeouts to work with, the Steelers quickly drove down the field with quarterback Ben Roethlisberger completing seven straight passes (excluding spikes), although the Steelers had to use both their timeouts during the drive. With just 14 seconds to go, the Steelers had a 2nd down and Goal from the four-yard line. Although the were well within field goal range to tie the score, the Steelers were attempting to take the lead with a touchdown. Roethlisberger took the snap from the shotgun and threw a quick pass to his left to wide receiver Antonio Brown who caught at the Baltimore 1-yard line. Brown was immediately hit by safety Eric Weddle and linebacker C. J. Mosley. Brown's forward progress was stopped, but he remained upright and was eventually able to reach the ball over the goal line with his left hand for the touchdown. The score, along with the extra point, gave the Steelers a 31–27 lead with only nine seconds left. The Ravens were unable to overcome the deficit with time running so short, allowing the Steelers to win the game and the AFC North.

Steelers losses

The Act (Nedney's Flop)

 (January 11, 2003, Pittsburgh Steelers vs. Tennessee Titans, AFC Divisional Game)

One week after an unforgettable victory over the division rival, Cleveland Browns, the Steelers traveled down to Tennessee to face the second seeded Titans. The Titans were coming off of an 11–5 record, and were heavily favored in the match-up. Early on, it looked as if that were the case. The Titans took an early 14–0 lead over the Steelers. But Titans running back Eddie George fumbled, mid-second quarter, giving the ball to the Steelers in their own territory. Quarterback Tommy Maddox connected with Hines Ward for an eight-yard strike on the second play of the drive. It was a dog fight from then on. The game saw three lead changes during the remainder of regulation. After a failed Steelers drive, Titans quarterback Steve McNair was given the ball on his own 20 with 1:43 to go, and the game tied at 31. He took his team right down the field and set up kicker Joe Nedney with a 48-yard field goal attempt with just three seconds remaining. Nedney, however, missed the kick, and the game went to overtime. The Titans won the toss and McNair was given another shot. After two long pass plays, the Titans offense had set up Nedney with another field goal attempt from 31 yards out. Nedney's initial attempt was good, but was nullified by a Steelers' timeout before the snap. Nedney missed the second attempt wide right. However, it was ruled that Steelers cornerback Dwayne Washington had run into the kicker. A five-yard penalty was enforced, and Nedney went on to make the 26-yard attempt, giving the Titans a 34–31 victory. Subsequent replays of the missed OT kick attempt appeared to show that Nedney had barely been touched.

3:16 Game 
On January 8, 2012, in the Wild Card round of the NFL playoffs, the Steelers played the Denver Broncos at Sports Authority Field at Mile High as defending AFC Champions. However, Broncos quarterback Tim Tebow outplayed the team and eventually scored the game-winning touchdown on a pass to Demaryius Thomas in overtime, in the first NFL game with the modified overtime rules with a final score of 29-23 Broncos. The Steelers would miss the playoffs entirely the next two years and wouldn't win a playoff game until the aforementioned infamous Bengals game four years later.

Same Old Browns 
Having clinched the division the previous week, the Steelers rested their starters in Week 17 of the 2020 NFL season against the Cleveland Browns. The Browns won the game 24–22 to clinch a playoff birth for the first time in 17 years. With the Steelers clinching the third seed and the Browns clinching the sixth seed, the two teams would play again just one week later in the 2020 Wild Card Playoffs. Over the subsequent days, the Browns had a small, but impactful COVID-19 outbreak that caused the team to be missing four players and five coaches – including head coach Kevin Stefanski – for the game. That coupled with the Browns previous failures caused some of the Steelers players and coaches to overlook the Browns and assume they would easily win the playoff game and move. JuJu Smith-Schuster famously said in the week leading to the game, "I think they’re still the same Browns teams I play every year. I think they’re nameless gray faces. They have a couple good players on their team, but at the end of the day, I don’t know. The Browns is the Browns." However, on the first offensive play of the game, center Maurkice Pouncey snapped the ball over Ben Roethlisberger's head and the Browns' Karl Joseph recovered the fumble in the end zone for a touchdown. The game quickly turned into a disaster as their next three drives ended in two interceptions and a punt; the Browns scored touchdowns on all of their drives and led 28–0 by the end of the first quarter. Despite attempting to make a comeback over the subsequent three quarters, which included Roethlisberger setting several passing records, the Steelers were always playing catch-up and the Browns held them off for a 48–37 win. The win gave the Browns their first playoff win in 26 Years and moved on to play the Chiefs in the AFC Divisional Round. The Steelers finished the game with five turnovers, including four Roethlisberger interceptions.

Penguins wins

Five goals, five different ways
On December 31, 1988, in a game against the New Jersey Devils at the Civic Arena, Pittsburgh Penguins superstar and future owner Mario Lemieux scored eight points and became the only player in NHL history to score a goal in all five possible game situations in the same game: even-strength, shorthanded, power-play, penalty shot, and empty-net, leaving him one goal short of a double hat-trick. It was later voted by NHL fans as the greatest moment in the NHL's first 100 years.

The Save I
On April 13, 1991, Penguins backup goalie Frank Pietrangelo made an incredible diving glove save against Peter Šťastný, who was shooting toward an open net, in the first period of Game 6 of a first-round playoff series at New Jersey during the 1991 Stanley Cup playoffs. Pietrangelo's stop helped the Penguins to a 4–3 win and forced a seventh game, where he proceeded to shut out the Devils 4–0. Although shortly thereafter Pietrangelo relinquished the starting goalie job to Tom Barrasso, the Penguins went on to win the Stanley Cup.

The Shush Game
In a bitter Game 6 of the 2009 Eastern Conference Quarterfinals, the hated Philadelphia Flyers, down three games to two, had jumped out to a 3–0 lead in the second period, and looked poised to force a Game 7 in Pittsburgh. However, after a chippy hit, a fight broke out between Daniel Carcillo and Max Talbot. Although the larger Carcillo manhandled the smaller Talbot, which energized the Philadelphia crowd, as he was being led away to the penalty box, Talbot put his index finger to his lips, facing up at the crowd, making a "shushing" motion. This defiance seemed to energize the Penguins, who scored five-straight unanswered goals, including two from Sidney Crosby to win the series. Talbot was later to be the hero in the Stanley Cup Finals that year, scoring the only two goals in the Game 7 that is mentioned below.

The Save II
In Game 7 of the 2009 Stanley Cup Finals against the Detroit Red Wings, the Penguins had the puck frozen in their own zone leading 2–1 with 6.5 seconds remaining. The Red Wings won the ensuing faceoff, and the puck came to Henrik Zetterberg, who shot it at the goal. Goalie Marc-André Fleury made the pad save, and the rebound came to Nicklas Lidström at the opposite faceoff circle, and he shot at the open net. In a play similar to the Pietrangelo save, Fleury dove across the net to knock the puck away as the clock ran out, giving the Penguins their third Stanley Cup in franchise history.

The Double OT Thriller
In Game 7 of the 2017 Eastern Conference Final, the Penguins faced the Ottawa Senators with an opportunity to return to the Stanley Cup Finals for a second consecutive year. After a scoreless first period, Chris Kunitz broke the ice with his first goal of the playoffs at 9:55 of the second; the lead was surrendered on a Mark Stone goal just 20 seconds later. A Justin Schultz powerplay goal at 11:44 of the third briefly put the Penguins up 2–1, until Ryan Dzingel scored less than three minutes later to tie the game once again. A tense overtime period, mostly dominated by the Pens, yielded no results as the game drifted into a second overtime period. At 5:09 of the second overtime, Kunitz one-timed a Sidney Crosby pass from the high slot, which fluttered through a Jean-Gabriel Pageau screen, over the right shoulder of Senator's goalie Craig Anderson. With his second goal of the game, Kunitz sent PPG Paints Arena into a frenzy and the Penguins into the Stanley Cup Finals for a second straight year. They would go on beat the Nashville Predators in six games, becoming the first team to win back to back championships in the salary cap era.

Spicy Pork and Broccoli

In Game 1 of the Eastern Conference First Round, the Penguins faced the New York Rangers to open the 2022 playoffs. The Penguins started Casey DeSmith in goal. The Rangers Adam Fox scored the first goal of the game at 9:19 of the first period. The Rangers forward Andrew Copp proceeded to score early into the second period giving the Rangers a 2–0 lead. Penguins forward Jake Guentzel finally put one behind Rangers goaltender Igor Shesterkin at 4:32 of the second period, and scored again at 11:47 of the same period. Chris Kreider of the Rangers quickly scored after to put the Rangers up one goal. Bryan Rust of the Penguins scored late in second period on the powerplay to tie the game up at 3. After a goaltender interference call that negated a presumed game-winning goal for the Rangers and no scoring in the third period the game went into overtime. Casey DeSmith had to leave the game in the second overtime due to an apparent injury. Desmith stopped 48 of the 51 Rangers shots on goal. Louis Domingue had to come in for relief. Shortly after this game became the longest game in Madison Square Garden history Penguins forward Evgeni Malkin scored the game-winning goal at 5:58 of the third overtime period. Louis Domingue was the winning goalie on record after stopping all 17 shots in relief. In the postgame interview Domingue was quoted saying "I ate spicy pork and broccoli during the intermission".

Penguins losses

The Nosedive of '75
Flying high after a two-game sweep of the St. Louis Blues in the preliminary round of the playoffs, the Penguins built up a commanding 3–0 lead in their best-of-seven conference semi-final against the New York Islanders, setting up the expectation of an all-Pennsylvania finale in the Prince of Wales Conference against their cross-state rivals, the Philadelphia Flyers (who had also swept their semi-final series against the Toronto Maple Leafs). Unfortunately, the Penguins utterly stalled and proceeded to lose four straight games, giving the Islanders the first 0–3 comeback in the NHL since the 1940s.

The Penguins continued to sputter for the next 16 years, not advancing past this stage in the playoffs until winning the Stanley Cup for the 1990-91 season.

Three-Peat Denied I
Coming off of back to back Stanley Cup victories, the 1992-93 Pens team dominated the league: they recorded 56 wins and 119 points, posted an NHL record 17 game winning streak, and captured the Presidents' Trophy for the first time in franchise history, all despite missing Mario Lemieux for 2 months while he underwent treatment for Hodgkin's lymphoma. Lemieux, despite his medical setback, had one of the best seasons of his career, finishing the regular season with 69 goals and 160 points in 60 games. His abbreviated campaign earned him the Art Ross, Hart, and Masterton trophies, as well as the Lester B. Pearson Award.

Entering the 1993 playoffs, the top seeded Penguins were heavily favored to win a third straight championship. They easily blew past the New Jersey Devils in five games, setting up a second round matchup with the NY Islanders. The Pens jumped out to a 3–2 series lead, but saw the Isles force Game 7. In the deciding game, the Isles clung to a 3–1 lead late in the 3rd, until Ron Francis scored with just under four minutes remaining to cut the deficit to 3–2. With one minute left in regulation, Rick Tocchet deflected a shot from Larry Murphy past Isles goaltender Glenn Healy, sending the game into overtime. At 5:16 of overtime, a David Volek shot off the rush, found its way past Tom Barrasso; the goal, Volek's second, stunned the Civic Arena crowd. Hopes for a three-peat came to a sudden and shocking end, as the Islanders advanced to the Wales Conference Final, where they lost to the eventual Cup champions, Montreal, in five games.

Three-Peat Denied II
The Penguins began the 2018 Stanley Cup playoffs as reigning, back to back Stanley Cup champions, the first team to win back to back Cups since the start of the salary cap era. They hoped to become the first team to three-peat since the Islanders did so in 1982. In a high scoring first round matchup with the rival Flyers, Sidney Crosby and Jake Guentzel powered the Pens with six goals each, as they dispatched Philly in 6 games. For a third straight year, the road to the Cup would include a second round matchup against Alex Ovechkin and the Washington Capitals. Entering the series, the Pens had beaten their rivals in the playoffs nine of their previous ten meetings, including victories during all five of their Cup runs. The Capitals and Ovechkin, in particular, were looking to silence critics and finally overcome their second round struggles.

The teams split the first two games at Capital One Arena, as the series shifted back to Pittsburgh for Games 3 and 4. Controversy erupted in Game 3, when Caps forward Tom Wilson delivered a high hit on Pens forward Zach Aston-Reese with 9:47 left in the second period. Aston-Reese left the game with a broken jaw and a concussion; Wilson was not penalized, but was subsequently suspended for three games by the league. The Caps took Game 3, 4–3, on a late Ovechkin goal; the Pens responded with a 3–1 victory in Game 4. During a pivotal game five in Washington, the Pens held a 3–2 lead entering the third period, before the Caps exploded with four goals to take the game 6–3. Back at PPG Paints Arena for Game 6, a goaltending duel broke out between Pittsburgh's Matt Murray and Washington's Braden Holtby, with each netminder surrendering only a single goal during regulation. All hopes of a three-peat ended at 5:27 of overtime, when Caps forward Evgeny Kuznetsov scored on a breakaway and silenced the sellout crowd. The Caps won the game 2–1, the series 4–2, and advanced to their first conference final since 1998. The victory propelled the Caps past the Lightning in seven games and eventually the Golden Knights in five games, en route to the franchise's first Stanley Cup. The Penguins have struggled in the playoffs ever since, losing four consecutive first-round series.

Pittsburgh Panthers

"Send it in, Jerome!"
Another famous event in Pittsburgh sports history came in a January 25, 1988 college men's basketball game between Pittsburgh and Providence. During the first half, Pitt went on a fast break off a steal, led by point guard (and current Arizona head coach) Sean Miller. He then found forward Jerome Lane on the wing, who went in for a dunk that shattered the backboard at Fitzgerald Field House, causing a delay of over 30 minutes until a replacement could be found. The incident, nationally televised on ESPN, is also remembered for Bill Raftery's call of "Send it in, Jerome!" shortly after the dunk.

13-9

In football, the 2007 edition of the Backyard Brawl was also the 100th anniversary of the famed rivalry game. A rowdy Morgantown crowd of over 60,000 were on hand to cheer on the #2 ranked Mountaineers, who needed one more win to secure their first appearance in a National Championship Game. The final obstacle standing in their way: an unranked, 4-7 Pitt team, who entered the game as 28.5 point underdogs. WVU's high-powered offense never found much cohesion, turning the ball over three times, while kicker Pat McAfee missed two crucial field goals, allowing the Panthers to remain within a single score at halftime. Trailing 7-3, Pitt took the lead in the third quarter on a 1 yard run by QB Pat Bostick and widened their lead in the fourth quarter on Conor Lee's 18 yard field goal. The 13-7 deficit put pressure on the Mountaineers, who saw a pair of late drives into Pitt territory end on failed fourth down conversions. With seconds left, Pitt punter Dave Brytus ran the ball through the end zone for an intentional safety, securing a 13-9 victory for the Panthers. West Virginia was knocked out of championship contention and settled for a bid in the Fiesta Bowl (where they beat Oklahoma 48-28). The upset was one of the biggest in the history of either school's program and was voted "Game of the Year" by ESPNU.

Rivalry Reignited

On September 1, 2022, the Backyard Brawl returned after an 11 year hiatus due to the NCAA's conference realignment. A standing room only crowd of 70,622 fans packed Acrisure Stadium, the most for a sporting event in Pittsburgh history. The reigning ACC Champion Panthers entered the season opener ranked #17 in the preseason AP poll, while the Mountaineers looked to shake off a disappointing 6-7 campaign the previous year. The nationally televised game lived up to the hype, as both teams traded scoring drives in the first half, entering halftime tied 10-10. The second half featured more dueling offensive outbursts from each team, though the Mountaineers claimed the momentum after scoring on consecutive drives to start the fourth quarter. Trailing 31-24 late, Pitt QB Kedon Slovis connected with RB Israel Abanikanda on a 24 yard touchdown pass to tie the game. On the ensuing series, West Virginia QB JT Daniels threw a 56 yard pick-six to Panthers defensive back M.J. Devonshire, giving Pitt a 38-31 lead with 2:58 remaining in the game. The Mountaineers mounted one last drive into Pitt territory trying to even the score, but fell short on an incomplete fourth down pass at the goal line with 22 seconds left. The Panthers entered victory formation to cap off the emotional comeback win. The game, which featured 7 lead changes, marked a triumphant return for one of college football's most storied rivalries.

US Firsts
 Minor League: 1877 with the formation of the International League.
 Two sport players: 1903 Fred Crolius and Christy Mathewson for the Pittsburgh Stars and Pittsburgh Pirates. 
 Standing ovation: May 28, 1956 Pirate slugger Dale Long gets a five-minute standing ovation at Forbes Field after hitting his 8th home run in 8 games against the Brooklyn Dodgers, the first curtain call in American sports history. 
 African-American manager: June 21, 1961 Gene Baker became the first African-American manager in Organized Baseball when the Pirates named him skipper of their Batavia Pirates farm club in the New York–Penn League.
 Family in the Hall of Fame: July 24, 1967 Pirates' great Lloyd Waner joins his brother, and fellow Pirate, Paul Waner in the Hall of Fame becoming the first brothers in any sports hall of fames.
 Hall of Fame waiver: March 20, 1973 Roberto Clemente became the first player to enter a major sports hall of fame, waiving the mandatory five-year waiting period.
 Back-to-back Hall of Fame broadcasters: April 10, 1976 Milo Hamilton announced his first Pirates game taking over for fellow hall-of-famer Bob Prince, making the Pirates the first major league team to have back-to-back hall of fame broadcasters. During this same season both hall of famers Myron Cope and Mike Lange also announced for the Steelers and Penguins respectively.
 Million Dollar Contract: January 26, 1979 Dave Parker of the Pirates became the first $1 million/year player in sports.
 Uniform uniforms: January 30, 1980 Pittsburgh became the first, and still only city, to have all its major professional teams don the same colors, when the Penguins completed the process.
 White House Double visit: February 22, 1980 President Jimmy Carter hosted both the Steelers and Pirates in a single ceremony to celebrate their respective championship wins in Super Bowl XIV and the 1979 World Series.
 Drug trials: 1985 The Pittsburgh drug trials took place and were the first investigation in sports doping and drug use.

Baseball Firsts
 Most Hits July 5, 1886: Pittsburgh Alleghenys' slugger Fred Carroll gets 9 hits against the Baltimore Orioles in a doubleheader.
 Monkey burial at home plate: 1887 Pittsburgh Alleghenys's Fred Carroll buried his pet monkey, which earlier served as an unofficial team mascot for the team, beneath the home plate at Recreation Park in a pre-game ceremony.
 21 runs in consecutive innings: June 6, 1894 The Pirates beat the Boston Beaneaters with 21 runs scored in just the 3rd and 4th innings, along with 4 home runs in a single inning, major league records.
 Rain Tarps: May 6, 1906 Rain tarps were first used in game at Exposition Park during a game between the Pirates and Chicago Cubs.
 3000th off a 20-game winner: June 9, 1914 Pirates' Hall of Famer Honus Wagner became the first player with a documented 3,000th hit and the only one to get it on a 20-game winner.
 Modern Glove: April 14, 1920 Pittsburgh-native Bill Doak introduced the modern glove to baseball as his St. Louis Cardinals played the Pirates.
 First-pitch homer: May 7, 1922 Pirates' rookie Walter Mueller becomes the first in baseball to hit a home run on the first major league pitch he sees.
 Eight modern-era triples: May 30, 1925 The Pirates hit eight triples against the St. Louis Cardinals at Forbes Field, the most in the World Series era.
 Recover from 3–1 deficit to win World Series:  October 15, 1925 The Pirates become the first MLB team to recover from a 3-games-to-1 deficit to win a best-of-seven World Series.
 Most Consecutive Hits allowed: June 23, 1930 The Pirates pitcher Heinie Meine sets the dubious baseball record for most consecutive hits allowed against the Brooklyn Dodgers.
 Hall of Famer: June 12, 1939 Honus Wagner becomes one of the four first players inducted into the Baseball Hall of Fame, receiving the second most votes.
 All Star Game multiple homers:July 8, 1941 Pirates' slugger Arky Vaughan becomes the first to hit multiple home runs in baseball's All Star Game.
 Back-to-back homers to start a game: July 6, 1945 and July 5, 1980, The Pirates become the only team to start two games with them against the Boston Braves and Houston Astros respectively.
 Night-game Season Opener: April 18, 1950 the Pirates and Cardinals become the first teams to open a season under the lights.
 Batting helmets: April 15, 1952 The Pirates became the first baseball team to don batting helmets for protection.
 Batting helmets for defense: 1953 The Pirates became the first, and last, team to use batting helmets on defense.
 Heisman Trophy winner to the baseball diamond: May 31, 1953 Vic Janowicz became the first Heisman Trophy winner to play major league baseball, when he played third base for the Pirates.
 Walk-off inside-the-park grand slam: July 25, 1956 Against the Chicago Cubs, Roberto Clemente becomes the first and only MLB player to hit a walk-off inside-the-park grand slam.  The hit occurred at Forbes Field.
 12 inning Perfect Game: May 26, 1959 Pirates ace Harvey Haddix at Milwaukee.
 World Series walk-off home run: October 13, 1960 Bill Mazeroski becomes the first MLB player to hit a walk-off home run to win a World Series.
 African-American Manager: June 21, 1961 Gene Baker for the Pirates.
 Mets win: April 23, 1962 Riding a 10-game win streak the Pirates lose to the expansion Mets at Forbes Field, the very first franchise win for the Mets.
 Southern game: April 12, 1966 the Pirates play Atlanta's very first baseball game, a 3–2 win.
 NL 14 inning opening day game: April 15, 1958 vs. the Braves and April 8, 1969, vs. St. Louis.
 NL 2nd baseman to play 392 straight: May 15, 1968 with Bill Mazeroski.
 LSD No hitter: June 12, 1970 Pirates pitcher Dock Ellis pitches the franchise's fourth no-hitter, with the Pirates winning the game on two Willie Stargell single shot homers against the San Diego Padres. Years later, Ellis would admit he was high on LSD the entire game, a first for baseball.
 All-Minority starting lineup On September 1, 1971, Pirates manager Danny Murtaugh fielded the first all-minority starting lineup in MLB history. In the game against the Philadelphia Phillies, the lineup consisted of Dock Ellis on the mound, Manny Sanguillén behind the plate, Al Oliver at first, Rennie Stennett at second, Dave Cash at third, Jackie Hernández at short stop, Roberto Clemente in right field, Gene Clines in center, and Willie Stargell in left. All were African American or Latino players.
 World Series night game: October 13, 1971 The Pirates host the first night game in World Series history at Three Rivers Stadium, winning Game 4 by a score of 4–3.
 Home Run only game: May 7, 1973 The Pirates record only five hits, all homers, in a 5–0 win against the Los Angeles Dodgers, the first such game in baseball history.
 NL Grand Slam Single: July 4, 1976 at Three Rivers Stadium the Pirates pitch the first Grand Slam Single to the rival Philadelphia Phillies, the first in the National League and just the second ever in Major League Baseball history.
 MVP clean sweep: 1979 The Pirates become the first team to sweep all of the available MVP awards in a single season.  Dave Parker is named MVP of the All-Star Game; and Willie Stargell claims the MVP awards for the NLCS, World Series, and National League (shared with Keith Hernandez).
 World Series Manager & MVP to be booed: May 20, 1988 at Three Rivers with former skipper Chuck Tanner and MVP Willie Stargell are booed for coaching rival Atlanta.
 #1 pick to win his first game: April 9, 1999 Kris Benson of the Pirates became the first #1 draft pick in National League history (second overall) to win his first game.
 Stealing First Base: June 26, 2001 Pirates manager Lloyd McClendon walks off the field with first base.
 Sausage assault arrest: July 9, 2003 Pirates slugger Randall Simon is arrested after jokingly "batting" away a Milwaukee Brewers sausage racer.
 Perogi firing: June 19, 2010 The Pirates become the first sports team in world history to fire a "perogi", dubiously during a series with the Cleveland Indians.
 4-5-4 triple play: May 9, 2015, the Pirates became the first MLB team to turn a 4-5-4 triple play during a 7–5 win over the St. Louis Cardinals. The play occurred when the Cardinals' Yadier Molina lined out to Pittsburgh second baseman Neil Walker. Walker then threw to third baseman Jung-ho Kang to double off the Cardinals' Jhonny Peralta for the second out. Kang then threw the ball back to Walker, who was standing on second base. for the final out after St. Louis's Jason Heyward froze between second and third.

Football Firsts
 Pro football player: November 12, 1892 William "Pudge" Heffelfinger is hired by the Allegheny Athletic Association for $500, becoming the first known professional football player.
 Pro football coach: 1893 Sport Donnelly of the Allegheny Athletic Association became the first known professional football coach.
 Pro football contract: 1893 A player, assumed to be Grant Dibert of the Pittsburgh Athletic Club, signed the first known pro football contract, which covered all of the club's games for the 1893 season.
 Pro football team owner: circa 1898 William Chase Temple bought up the player contracts for the Duquesne Country and Athletic Club, becoming the first individual owner of a professional football team.
 Pro football all-star game: December 3, 1898 The first ever professional football all-star game held between the Duquesne Country and Athletic Club and players from Western Pennsylvania All-Stars.
 "National" Football League title: November 29, 1902 Pittsburgh Stars defeated the Philadelphia Athletics, 11–0, at the Pittsburgh Coliseum.
 Mic’d Up NFL Player: December 10, 1967, Steelers linebacker Bill Saul became the first NFL player to wear a microphone, during a game against the Washington Redskins.
 Super Bowl titles: First NFL franchise to win four Super Bowls; first NFL franchise to win six Super Bowls.

Hockey Firsts
 Professional ice hockey league: 1902 Western Pennsylvania Hockey League becomes the first ice hockey league to openly hires and trades players.
 Hockey trade:January 28, 1908: The first trade in professional ice hockey took place between the two city teams the Pittsburgh Bankers and Pittsburgh Pirates.
 Changing players on the fly: This article from the December 21, 1925 Pittsburgh Press describes how  Pittsburgh Pirates' coach Odie Cleghorn would change the forward line halfway through each period with another set of attackers, who would play for "six or eight minutes". The first line would then come back on to finish the period. The defencemen were not changed.
 Three lines: The Pirates were also the first team to use three set forward lines, which was a huge change from the standard, which was to simply leave the best players out for as long as possible.
 "Miracle" coach suspended: January 16, 2000 Penguins coach Herb Brooks, made famous as the coach of the 1980 US Hockey Olympic Team, was suspended by the NHL on after confronting a Denver broadcasterafter a game with the Colorado Avalanche.
 Winter Classic win: January 1, 2008 The Penguins won the first ever NHL Winter Classic defeating the Buffalo Sabres at Ralph Wilson Stadium. Sidney Crosby scored the first Classic game winner.
 Prime-time Winter Classic: January 1, 2011 The Penguins hosted the first prime time Winter Classic, first to be held in an NCAA football stadium and first to use a cable-cam, as well as the first Winter Classic alumni game.

Basketball Firsts
 African-American drafted In 1955 the Duquesne Dukes boasted of the NBA's first African American player chosen in a sports draft.
 College to produce back-to-back NBA #1 Draft picks: In both 1955 and 1956 the Duquesne Dukes produced the #1 NBA Draft pick, to date the only college basketball program to accomplish such a feat.
 National High School Tournament in 1965 the Roundball Classic was first held at the Civic Arena as the first nationwide pre-college basketball tournament, the classic was held in the city every year until 1993.
 Championship with the dunk and 3-point shot: The Pittsburgh Pipers won the ABA Title in 1968, the first league to allow the dunk and 3-point shot in professional basketball and the Pipers the first to win such a championship.

World Lasts

Hockey Lasts
 Baker's last game: March 24, 1917 Hobey Baker, considered the first American star in ice hockey by the Hockey Hall of Fame, played the last game of his career at the Pittsburgh Winter Garden.
 Vezina's last game: November 28, 1925 The Pittsburgh Pirates upset the Montreal Canadiens, 1–0, in the final game for legendary Habs goaltender, Georges Vezina.
 No Mask Goalie: April 7, 1974 Penguins goaltender Andy Brown is the last of the "ironmen netminders", the last NHL player not to wear a mask.

Baseball Lasts
 Ruthian Home Runs: Babe Ruth hit his last 3 home run game and last career home run at Forbes Field on May 25, 1935, only days before retiring.  Ruth's final career home run cleared the right field upper-deck pavilion at Forbes Field — the first fair ball ever hit out of the stadium.

References

External links
 The 4 Most Dramatic Moments in Pittsburgh Sports History
 The 10 Worst Moments in Pittsburgh Sports

Pittsburgh Steelers
Pittsburgh Pirates
Pittsburgh Penguins
Pittsburgh Panthers
Lore